The Human Rights and Minorities Affairs Department is a department of the Government of Punjab, Pakistan. The department is responsible for protection and safeguarding the fundamental human rights without any distinction of creed, race or religion. The department also refers and recommends investigations and inquiries in case of any violation of human rights.

Administration of minorities affairs is done under The Christian Marriage Act 1872 and
The Hindu Gains of Learning Act 1930.

See also 
 Minorities in Pakistan
 Minority Affairs Department, Sindh
 Human rights in Pakistan

References

External links
 

Departments of Government of Punjab, Pakistan
Religion in Pakistan
Human rights in Pakistan